The reluctant hero is a heroic archetype typically found in fiction. The reluctant hero is typically portrayed either as an everyman forced into surreal situations which require him to rise to heroism and its acts, or as a person with special abilities who nonetheless reveals a desire to avoid using those abilities for selfless benefit. In either case, the reluctant hero does not initially seek adventure or the opportunity to do good, and their apparent selfishness may induct them into the category of antiheroes. The reluctant hero differs from the antihero in that the story arc of the former inevitably results in their becoming a true hero.

In many stories, the reluctant hero is portrayed as having a period of doubt after their initial venture into heroism. This may arise from the negative consequences of their own heroic actions, or by the achievement of some position of personal safety  leaving the audience to wonder whether the reluctant hero will return to heroism at the moment when they are needed the most (typically the climax). In real life, there are cases in history and popular culture where people have been perceived as reluctant heroes.

Quotes
A summary of the archetype:

Another commentator notes, with respect to game design:

Examples

In fiction
 In the movie Die Hard, Officer John McClane of the NYPD became a reluctant hero, when on Christmas Eve, West German terrorist Hans Gruber took over the Nakatomi Plaza, Los Angeles in an attempt to steal millions of bearer bonds. McClane, who was at Nakatomi Plaza, where his wife, Holly Gennaro was an employee, for the Christmas Party, was able to remain hidden from the group of terrorists, and was able to cause chaos, eventually spoiling Gruber's Christmas celebrations. Sgt. Al Powell of the LAPD who did not like using a gun after accidentally killing a young boy at a crime scene, also becomes a reluctant hero when he shoots and kills, the enraged terrorist known only as 'Karl'.
 Robert A. Segal characterizes Arjuna from the Hindu epic The Mahabharata as a reluctant hero.  Arjuna casts aside his weapons, fearful at the prospect of killing his kinsman during a civil war. Krishna then relates to Arjuna a series of arguments that convince Arjuna to go to war nonetheless.
 In Star Wars, Han Solo is portrayed as a reluctant hero. He is hesitant to join the Alliance to Restore the Republic due to being an outlaw. In the Expanded Universe novel Balance Point his son Jacen fit the characteristics of reluctant hero. He is unwilling to fight out of fear that the galaxy will tumble into darkness. In the end, he saves his mother's life and wounds the Yuuzhan Vong Warmaster Tsavong Lah.
 Spider-Man also fits the criteria of reluctant hero as throughout his career, Peter Parker constantly questions his decision to become a superhero.  One of the most famous examples would be The Amazing Spider-Man issue 50, titled Spider-Man No More!.
 Eddie Valiant from Who Framed Roger Rabbit fits into this category, being forced out of a depressive funk in order to solve a murder and prove the innocence of Roger Rabbit. 
 Captain Mainwaring, of Dad's Army, shows traits of a reluctant hero as he casts aside his self-important personality to protect his platoon and country.
 Max Rockatansky
 Aang from Avatar: The Last Airbender is the current incarnation of the Avatar who controls four elements to maintain the peace. Though reluctant, he must fight to end a war which has gone for 100 years.
 The Doctor from Doctor Who played the reluctant hero, preferring to solve things with peace instead of war. This was shown during his third, fourth, fifth, eighth, tenth, eleventh, and thirteenth incarnations.
 Nathan Lind from Godzilla vs. Kong, a geologist and cartographer who helps Kong.
 Oliver Cromwell from Cromwell (1970) and Rodrigo from El Cid (1961) are both historical figures who are presented as reluctant heroes, chosen by the people to fight for honour. Both are pulled away from their families and their home where they would rather spend their time and reluctantly sacrifice their normal lives for the people of their lands

In real life

 Alvin York, a World War I draftee who was a conscientious objector, but who as a soldier defeated a large contingent of German troops as a sniper. York's achievement was then fictionalized in several movies, in which his stature as a reluctant hero was expanded.
 Neil Armstrong has been described as "a reluctant American hero".

References

Heroes